KNOZ (97.7 FM) is a radio station licensed to Orchard Mesa, Colorado, United States, broadcasting an adult hits format. KNOZ serves the Grand Junction, Colorado, area and is owned by Paul Varecha. KNOZ is a full simulcast of KRYD 104.9 Norwood, CO, running the Jack FM adult hits satellite format. Prior to July 2014, KNOZ aired an all news format.

References

External links
KNOZ/KRYD's official website

NOZ